"Beautiful Tonight" is the fourth single from the album Make Some Noise by Krystal Meyers, released in the United States and Japan in 2008.

Background 

"Beautiful Tonight" is a song about being human, fallible and finding redemption and restoration after falling into what Meyers called sin. It was written by Meyers and Adam B Smith and was sent to Rock Radio almost immediately after "My Freedom" peaking at No. 22 on R&R's Christian Rock Chart.

References

2008 singles
Krystal Meyers songs
Songs written by Krystal Meyers
Essential Records (Christian) singles
2008 songs